The Indian state of Madhya Pradesh is divided into 52 districts, which are further divided into 428 tehsils, or subdistricts.

As an entity of local government, the tehsil office exercises certain fiscal and administrative power over the villages and municipalities within its jurisdiction. It is the ultimate executive agency for land records and related administrative matters. The chief official is called the tehsildar. In some instances, tehsils overlap with "blocks" (panchayat union blocks or panchayat development blocks) and come under the land and revenue department, headed by tehsildar; and blocks come under the rural development department, headed by the block development officer and serve different government administrative functions over the same or similar geographical area.

List of tehsils

See also
 List of districts of Madhya Pradesh

References

 
Madhya Pradesh